Ginevet is an abandoned settlement and a former village in the Armavir Province of Armenia.

References

Former populated places in Armavir Province